Croatia (HR) is included in the Nomenclature of Territorial Units for Statistics (NUTS) of the European Union. The NUTS of Croatia were defined during the Accession of Croatia to the European Union, codified by the Croatian Bureau of Statistics in early 2007. The regions were revised twice, first in 2012, and then in 2021.

The three NUTS levels are:
 NUTS-1: Croatia
 NUTS-2: 4 regions (non-administrative)
 NUTS-3: 21 counties (administrative)

The NUTS codes are as follows:

Below the NUTS levels, there are two LAU levels:
 LAU-1: none (same as NUTS-3)
 LAU-2: Cities and municipalities (Gradovi i općine)

See also
 Subdivisions of Croatia
 ISO 3166-2 codes of Croatia
 FIPS region codes of Croatia

References

Croatia
Subdivisions of Croatia